Nireekshana is a 2005 Indian Telugu-language action drama film directed by N Seetaram and starring Aryan Rajesh and Sridevi.

Plot 
The film follows a man (Ravindra) who is in desperate need in money and happens to see a woman (Anu). Later, he learns that the woman is worth a large sum of money and is locked up in a farmhouse. How he saves her forms the rest of the story.

Cast 

Aryan Rajesh as Ravindra
Sridevi as Anu
Nagendra Babu
Rama Prabha
M. S. Narayana 
Tanikella Bharani 
Dharmavarapu Subramanyam
Satyam Rajesh as Ravindra's friend
Ali 
Benerji
Surya
Gundu Hanumantha Rao
Gautham Raju
Siva Reddy
 Jyothy
Anant
 Ganesh
Rambabu
Ravi Varma
Narsing Yadav
Kalpana  
Archana Rai
Babu Mohan

Reception
Jeevi of Idlebrain.com wrote that "Nireekshana - D Rama Naidu's film after a long gap - disappoints". B. Anuradha of Rediff.com opined that "Nireekshana is definitely a film to avoid". A critic from Sify stated that "Nireekshana is one of those films you wished you never saw!" Himabindu Chatta of Full Hyderabad said that "The movie is a remix of an assortment of older, better films, but even the flimsy cut-and-paste-job could have been much more refined".

References